Antheacheridae is a family of cyclopoid copepods in the order Cyclopoida. There are at least four genera and about seven described species in Antheacheridae.

Genera
These four genera belong to the family Antheacheridae:
 Antheacheres Sars M., 1857
 Coelotrophus Ho, Katsumi & Honma, 1981
 Gastroecus Hansen, 1886
 Staurosoma Will, 1844

References

Cyclopoida
Articles created by Qbugbot
Crustacean families